Buskhyttan is a locality situated in Nyköping Municipality, Södermanland County, Sweden with 225 inhabitants in 2010.

Elections 
Buskhyttan belongs to the Koppartorp district, which comprises the rural eastern portion of Tunaberg. Unlike fellow Tunaberg district, less rural and more left-wing Nävekvarn, Koppartorp is more of a swing district between the traditional blocs.

Riksdag

References 

Populated places in Södermanland County
Populated places in Nyköping Municipality